San Telmo may refer to:

People 
Erasmus of Formiae (Saint Elmo), the patron saint of sailors
Peter Gonzalez, also known as Saint Elmo or Saint Telmo

Places 
 San Telmo Island, an island of the coast of Antarctica named after the ship
 Isla San Telmo, an island off the coast of Panama
 Palace of San Telmo, a historical edifice in Seville, Spain
 Sant Elm, a town in Andratx, Mallorca known as San Telmo in Castilian
 San Telmo, Baja California, a city in Mexico
 San Telmo, Buenos Aires, a barrio in Argentina
 Club Atlético San Telmo, an association football club in the San Telmo barrio
 Feria de San Telmo, an antique fair in the San Telmo barrio
 Visita de San Telmo, a mission station in Baja California, Mexico

Other 
 San Telmo (ship), a ship wrecked off Antarctica
 The Santelmo (St. Elmo's Fire) is a creature of Philippine mythology

See also 
 Telmo (disambiguation)
 Saint Elmo (disambiguation) for all places named after the saints
 Elmo (disambiguation)
 St. Elmo's fire (disambiguation)